Edward the King may refer to:
Edward the King (play), a play by David Brendan Hopes
Edward the Seventh, also known as Edward the King, a 1975 television drama series